Moussa Ndikumana (born 30 December 1998) is a Burundian football midfielder who plays for Bugesera.

References

1998 births
Living people
Burundian footballers
Burundi international footballers
Vital'O F.C. players
Bugesera FC players
Association football midfielders
Burundian expatriate footballers
Expatriate footballers in Rwanda
Burundian expatriate sportspeople in Rwanda
Atlético Olympic FC players